This is a list of seasons played by Kent County Cricket Club in English cricket. It summarises the club's achievements in major competitions, and the top run-scorers and wicket-takers in the County Championship for each season.

Kent County Cricket Club was formed in August 1846 and played their first competitive match in the same month against an England team at White Hart Field in Bromley. Before the official formation of the County club, teams had represented Kent for many years, with the first recorded match involving Kent taking place in 1719 against a London side. In the years before the formation of the County Championship the club competed in County cricket as well as playing other first class matches. Kent have played in every County championship since the official formation of the competition in 1890, winning the competition seven times, including four times during the Golden Age of cricket in the early years of the 20th century.

Seasons
The list below contains details of the county's performance in every English domestic competition since the formation of the County Championship in 1890.

Key

Top run scorer/wicket taker shown in bold when he was the leading run scorer/wicket taker in the country.

Key to league record:
Div - division played in
P – games played
W – games won
L – games lost
D – games drawn
Tie – game tied
A – games abandoned
Pts – points
Pos – final position

Key to rounds:
Pre - preliminary round
R1 – first round
R2 – second round, etc.
QF – quarter-final
SF – semi-final
Grp – group stage
RU - runners-up
n/a – not applicable

Notes

References
History - England domestic competitions, CricInfo
Reid J (ed) (2016) "Match Records" in 2016 Kent County Cricket Club Annual, pp. 191–194, Kent County Cricket Club.

External links
Yearly tables 1890-present / The County Championship Tables, ESPN Cricinfo
Kent County Cricket Club official website

Seasons
 
Seasons, Kent